João Azevedo (born 1921) was a Portuguese equestrian. He competed in two events at the 1956 Summer Olympics.

References

External links
 

1921 births
Possibly living people
Portuguese male equestrians
Olympic equestrians of Portugal
Equestrians at the 1956 Summer Olympics
Place of birth missing (living people)